Anistreplase is a thrombolytic drug. It is also known as anisoylated plasminogen streptokinase activator complex (APSAC). As a thrombolytic drug, it is used to treat blood clots in emergency situations.

Uses 
Anistreplase is used to treat blood clots in emergency situations such as myocardial infarction. Early treatment gives better outcomes.

Mechanism of action 
Anistreplase is a complex of purified human plasminogen and bacterial streptokinase that has been acylated to protect the enzyme's active site. When the drug is administered, the acyl group gets hydrolyzed, thereby freeing the activator complex. It converts plasminogen to plasmin, which in turn degrades fibrin (blood clots) to fibrin split products.

History 
Anistreplase has been developed by Beecham under the brand name Eminase. It is also known as anisoylated plasminogen streptokinase activator complex (APSAC) after its components.

References 

Antithrombotic enzymes